The University of Limerick (UL) is a public research university institution in Limerick, Ireland. Founded in 1972 as the National Institute for Higher Education, Limerick, it became a university in 1989 in accordance with the University of Limerick Act 1989. It was the first university established since Irish independence in 1922, followed by the establishment of Dublin City University later the same day.

It has over 11,000 full-time undergraduate students, including over 2,400 international students, and 1,500 part-time students. There are over 800 research postgraduates and 1,300 postgraduate students receiving instruction at the university. Its co-operative education ("co-op") programme offers students an up to eight-month work placement as part of their degree; it was Ireland's first such programme.

Following founding president Edward M. Walsh, Roger GH Downer, John O'Connor, Don Barry and Des Fitzgerald were presidents of UL from 1998 to August 2020. The current president is Professor Kerstin Mey.

History

University campaign

According to founding president Edward M. Walsh, the mayor of Limerick applied for a college of the planned Queen's University of Ireland to be established in the city. However, in 1850, Queen's College, Belfast, Cork and Galway were established instead. In 1908 there was an attempt to link the National University of Ireland and Mungret College, about five kilometres from Limerick. Mungret offered bachelor's- and master's-level courses in the faculty of arts, with degrees conferred by the Royal University of Ireland, from 1888 to 1908. The university was dissolved in 1909 and replaced by the National University of Ireland, marking the end of tertiary education at Mungret. Degrees were awarded to students at Mungret College by the NUI from 1909 to 1912 to accommodate students who had matriculated at the Royal University.

The campaign for a university in Limerick began in earnest by the late 1950s. The Limerick University Project Committee was founded in September 1959 by the mayor of Limerick in 1957, Ted Russell. Another supporter, Dermot Kinlen, was a High Court judge and the first state inspector general of prisons and places of detention. Russell and Kinlen received honorary degrees from the university in 2002.

National Institute for Higher Education, Limerick
Successful economic-development policies during the 1960s led to an influx of foreign investment in Ireland and demand for expertise not met by the existing universities. Ireland established the National Institute for Higher Education (NIHE) at Limerick, modelled on the technological universities of continental Europe, and perhaps the polytechnic approach being developed in the UK. Edward Walsh took office as chairman of the planning board and director of the institute on 1 January 1970.  This more twentieth-century and continental approach is illustrated by its use of funding from the World Bank, European Investment Bank and philanthropists. Construction on phase one, for example, used financing from the World Bank. Faculty and staff were recruited internationally, and they — in addition to extensive teaching and research facilities — attracted foreign investment led by Analog Devices (which manufactured Ireland's first silicon chips).

The first students were enrolled in 1972, when the institute was opened by Taoiseach Jack Lynch. The European Investment Bank financed the second phase of development. Billionaire philanthropist Chuck Feeney was a major donor to the university. Shannon Development was also an early supporter of the project, supporting the NIHE proposal to establish the National Technological Park as an integrated campus.

A change of government resulted in NIHE Limerick applying for recognition as a recognised college of the National University of Ireland, which awarded degrees to its graduates in 1977. After strong opposition by students and others, NIHE Limerick withdrew from the NUI and was established as an independent institution. From 1978 to 1988, the National Council for Educational Awards (NCEA) was the degree-awarding authority for NIHE Limerick.

University status
In 1989, NIHE Limerick was established by legislation as the University of Limerick and NIHE Dublin was established as Dublin City University, each with the power to award its own degrees. These became the first institutes since Irish independence to be given the title "university".

Expansion occurred in 1991, after the incorporation of Thomond College of Education, Limerick. Thomond, sharing a common campus, was founded in 1973 as the National College of Physical Education and became the department of educational and professional studies, focusing on secondary education. Since 1991, degrees from Mary Immaculate College, Limerick have also been awarded by UL. MIC degrees are offered in primary education and arts programmes, and degrees awarded at St. Patrick's College, Thurles have been conferred by UL since 2012. University history under the leadership of founding president Edward M Walsh is profiled in Walsh's 2011 memoir, Upstart: Friends, Foes and Founding a University.

Elements of the US university system were adopted, including cooperative education, grade point average marking and the trimester system. During the 1970s, limited public financing led Walsh and his team to seek World Bank and European Investment Bank funding. Sophisticated private-sector fundraising programmes were later developed, based on US university models and guided by an international leadership board under founding chair Chuck Feeney and Lewis Glucksman. The campus developed primarily as a result of such fundraising activity.

The university has been an active participant in the European Union's Erasmus Programme since 1988 and has 207 partner institutions in 24 European countries. In addition, UL students may study at partner universities in the US, Canada, Australia, New Zealand, Brazil, China and Singapore.

UL allied with NUI Galway in 2010, sharing resources.

Presidents

 Edward M. Walsh, founding president (1972–1998)
 Roger Downer (1998–2006)
 John O'Connor (2006–2007)
 Don Barry (2007–2017)
 Desmond Fitzgerald (2017–2020)
 Kerstin Mey (interim from 2020, confirmed 2021)

Organisation

Governance
In accordance with legislation, the university is directed by a policy-making Governing Authority, whose functions are outlined in the National Institute for Higher Education, Limerick, Act, 1980, amended in the University of Limerick Act, 1989, which raised the institution's status to that of a university and provided for related matters. There are several other important acts concerning the college include the Universities Act, 1997, which allows for the creation of University Statutes.

The Governing Authority's 29 members are chosen by a wide range of groups and authorities and include members elected by staff (in various classes) and students (ex-officio based on elections of Students Union officers).

The university is headed, titularly, by the Chancellor. As of 2019, the Chancellor of the University of Limerick is Mary Harney, Tanaiste for 9 years and the first female leader of an Irish political party.  Previous chancellors included Miriam Hederman O'Brien and Seán Donlon.

Faculty

The university has four faculties:
 Kemmy Business School (Scoil Ghnó Kemmy)
 Faculty of Education and Health Sciences (including the Graduate Medical School)
 Faculty of Science and Engineering
 Faculty of Arts, Humanities and Social Sciences
Two colleges are linked to the university: Mary Immaculate College and MIC, St. Patrick's Campus, Thurles.

Kemmy Business School has Triple Crown accreditation (AACSB, EQUIS and AMBA).  It has four academic departments, which are Accounting & Finance, Economics, Management & Marketing, and Personnel & Employment Relations. The school's courses include accounting, finance, economics, marketing, and risk management among other courses. The Kemmy Business School is the first European university to have a custom-designed campus trading floor, which uses the trading software Bloomberg Professional. Through the Kemmy school, students have the option of completing the Bloomberg certification. Named after the former mayor of Limerick, Jim Kemmy, the business school has both undergraduate and postgraduate courses on offer.

Students

UL has a students' union, representing the student body. It is presided over by three sabbatical officers: a president, an academic officer and a welfare officer. Policy decisions are made by the sabbatical officers and the class representation council.

ULSU is the representative body for the 13,500 UL students. The union operates from their office in the main courtyard, which has been refurbished and provides a place for students to relax throughout the day. ULSU Ents, part of the students' union, organises entertainment for university students throughout the year. Most take place during Freshers Week and Charity Week.

The university also has a postgraduate students' union with a full-time, sabbatical postgraduate president representing the postgraduate student body. It is one of two Irish universities with such a position.

Clubs and societies
UL has over 70 student-run clubs and societies. Clubs are supported by the students' union, the sports department and the arts office. In March 2014, the clubs and societies refused to recognise the Pro-Life Society—the first society not recognised by the student council. Since then, every new club or society must be voted on by the council and undergo a trial period (usually 14 weeks).

President's Volunteer Award
The President's Volunteer Award (PVA), administered by the university's community-liaison office, was established to harness, acknowledge and support the contributions which students at the University of Limerick make to their communities. It draws on a strong tradition of student volunteerism on and off-campus. The PVA's primary goals are:
 To sustain and foster a culture of volunteerism, active citizenship and civic engagement among the student population
 To develop collaborative projects and further existing initiatives between UL and the community
 To formally acknowledge and support the contributions which UL student volunteers make to the community
 To promote the development of civic and leadership skills in students.

Rankings

The university is ranked fourth in attracting students who attain over 500 points on the Leaving Certificate. It is the only college in Ireland to receive a maximum five stars for its sports facilities.

UL was ranked 471–480 worldwide in the 2011 QS World University Rankings and 71–80 for universities less than 50 years old. Its highest QS ranking (394) was reached in 2008, and its science and engineering faculty was ranked 364th worldwide.

It was the 2015 University of the Year in the Sunday Times Good University Guide because of the university's record in graduate employability, improved academic performance, the €52-million Bernal Project and a strong record in research commercialisation. UL is Ireland's only university to receive five stars for graduate employability and teaching in the 2011–12 QS reports. The school also received five stars for infrastructure, internationalisation, innovation and engagement.

Science and engineering

The arts

UL is home to the Irish World Academy of Music and Dance, a centre for innovation and research in music and dance performance and scholarship, and the Irish Chamber Orchestra (Ireland's leading international chamber orchestra, funded by An Chomhairle Ealaíon (the Irish Arts Council). All three organisations commission and perform new Irish music and dance.

The University Concert Hall (UCH) is UL's principal venue for the performing arts. The 1,000-seat hall was Ireland's first purpose-built concert hall.

The Bourn Vincent Gallery is UL's principal venue for temporary exhibitions, with an ancillary programme of seminars, lectures and performances. UL's art collection includes outdoor sculpture by international artists, including Michael Warren, Peter Logan, Alexandra Wejchert, James McKenna, Tom Fitzgerald, Antony Gormley and (most recently) Sean Scully.

Housing
Many housing districts near UL have a majority-student population, especially in the adjacent Castletroy area. In recent years, several large student apartment complexes have been built a 15-20-minute walk from UL with Section 50 tax incentives. Unlike most similar Irish higher education institutes, much housing is on-campus; there are five on-campus student villages, the newest opening in 2006.

The oldest is Plassey Village, opposite UL's main gate. Accommodating 424 students in terraced houses with four or eight bedrooms and a kitchen-living area, it is primarily occupied by first-year students. Built from 1987 to 1992 in four phases, it has a village hall and many small gardens. During the summers of 2010 and 2011, the village's residences were renovated.

Kilmurry Village, the second-oldest student village, is on the east of the campus. It accommodates 540 students in six- or eight-bedroom terraced houses. It is the closest village to the University Arena, which has an Olympic-standard 50-metre swimming pool. The village was built between 1994 and 1997 in two phases. Minor renovations were made during summer 2011, primarily to the kitchens.

Dromroe Village, completed in 2001, is on the south bank of the Shannon. The first high-rise building houses 457 students in six-, four- or two-bedroom ensuite apartments.

Thomond Village, which opened for the autumn 2004 semester, were the first university buildings on the north bank of the Shannon in County Clare. It has accommodation for 504 students in six-, four-, two- and one-bedroom apartments.

Cappavilla Village, the newest student village, opened in September 2006 on the North Bank near the new Health Sciences Building. An extension of Cappavilla opened in September 2007.

Many off-campus student accommodations vary in distance from the campus. Elm Park, College Court, Briarfield and Oaklawns are popular estates with many student residences. Troy Student Village and Courtyard Hall, privately managed student residences slightly further from the campus, are served by a shuttle bus.

Sport

University Arena
The on-campus University Arena is Ireland's largest indoor sports complex. Open since 2002, it consists of the National 50m Swimming Pool. The arena's  Indoor Sports Hall has four wooden courts for a variety of sports, a sprint track, an international 400m athletics track and a 200m, three-lane, suspended jogging track. The facility has a cardiovascular and strength-training centre, a weight-training room, team rooms, an aerobics studio and classrooms. The Arena is often used by the Munster rugby team.

Its €28 million development was made possible with €7.6 million in government grants, a  €6.9 million donation from the University of Limerick Foundation, about €4 million in student contributions and commercial funding. Each year, it accommodates over 500,000 customers and many international athletes and teams.

The arena hosted the 2010 Special Olympics Ireland Games, from 9 to 13 June. In one of the year's largest Irish sporting events, 1,900 Special Olympians from throughout Ireland participated in the games.

All-weather sports complex
UL's €9 million, all-weather sports complex on the North Campus is the largest all-weather sports-field complex in Europe. The multi-purpose, floodlit, artificial turf park has two soccer, one rugby and one GAA pitch. Third-generation all-weather surfaces are similar to natural grass and are designed for full contact. Each full-size pitch can be sub-divided to create smaller playing areas for various sports. The largest artificial-grass development in Ireland to date, it is designed to World Rugby, GAA and FIFA specifications.

The synthetic surface reduces the risk of injury caused by hard or uneven surfaces. The Sports Pavilion Building has changing rooms, squad and coaching rooms and bar, restaurant and conference facilities. The complex is funded from a number of sources, including operating income and campus-based commercial activities.

The playing pitches opened in July 2011, and the Sports Pavilion was expected to open in November 2011. The facility is available to the general public as well as the campus community. In addition to these facilities, conventional playing fields, tennis courts, an artificial-turf pitch, an outdoor athletics track and the University Boathouse are on the Limerick side of the river. The boathouse has Ireland's only indoor rowing tank, which can accommodate up to 8 rowers simultaneously. The tank can simulate a variety of water conditions, providing training opportunities for rowers to reach international standards. The building also includes a launch jetty into the Shannon, a pontoon and a café.

Expansion

The university's Foundation Building, including the University Concert Hall (home to the Irish Chamber Orchestra), the library and several others, were built during the 1990s. The Materials & Surface Science Institute (MSSI) building, Dromroe Student Village, a sports arena and swimming pool were built between 2000 and 2004. In 2005, the Engineering Research Building and Millstream Courtyard buildings opened in a complex near the Foundation Building.

The Kemmy Business School building was constructed next to the Schuman Building, and will be the world's first business school with a live trading floor. Several new buildings have opened on the north bank of the Shannon. The University Bridge, opened in late 2004, provides road and pedestrian access to the planned North Bank campus. Thomond Village was the first North Bank facility (opening in 2004), followed by the Health Sciences Building in 2005. The Living Bridge, a pedestrian bridge, connects the Millstream Courtyard and the Health Sciences Building. Cappavilla Village was completed in mid-2006 on the North Bank; a building for the Irish World Music Centre (formerly in the Foundation Building basement), began construction in May 2007 and was completed in January 2010. An architectural-faculty building is under construction opposite the CSIS building. The university hopes to expand the North Bank campus to the size of the original campus.

Construction timeline
 1972 – Physical Education and Sport Sciences Building (originally home to the Thomond College of Education, and renovated in 2012)
 1974 – Main Building, phase 1A (Blocks A and B)
 1978 – Schrödinger Building
 1984 – Main Building, phase 1B (Blocks C—extended in 1996—D and E)
 1985–99 – Student Centre (including the Students' Union building)
 1992 – Robert Schuman Building
 1993 – Foundation Building (with the University Concert Hall)
 1996 – Kathleen Lonsdale Building
 1997 – Glucksman Library and Information Services Building
 1999 – Computer Science Building
 2000–01 – University Arena
 2002 – MSSI Building
 2005 – Engineering Research Building and Millstream Courtyard
 2005 – Health Sciences Building
 2007 – Living Bridge
 2007 – Jim Kemmy Business School
 2008 – University of Limerick Boathouse (student-funded, with storage and training space for rowing, kayak, mountain-bike and sub-aqua clubs)
 2008 – Irish Chamber Orchestra Building
 2009 – Languages Building
 2009 – Academy of World Music and Dance
 2011 – School of Medicine (graduate)
 2011 – Tierney Building
 2011 – Lero and IEC Building
 2013 – Bernal Building and MSSI extension
 2015 – Analog Devices Building
 2017 – The Stables Club Renovation 
 2018 – Glucksman Library Extension
 2020 - New Student Centre (delayed indefinitely) - Construction of the €20 million building began in 2019, however, the contractor for the project, Keating Construction, collapsed into liquidation in February 2021 with debts of €30 million. Construction is currently suspended.
 2021 - Climbing Wall Centre

Limerick 2030
UL has committed to a presence in Limerick city centre as part of the Limerick 2030 plan to help drive renewal of the city centre. All the university's main faculties are presently in Castletroy, about 5 km from the city centre. Former UL president Don Barry outlined his vision of the plan in July 2013: "My dream is that in a few years’ time, there will be hundreds of students of the university participating in the life of the city, learning in the city, recreating in the city and contributing to the revitalisation of the Limerick city centre. Limerick is our city and we are its university."

Notable alumni and staff

See also
 University of Limerick Students' Union
 Education in the Republic of Ireland
 List of universities in the Republic of Ireland
 List of public art in Limerick

Footnotes

External links
 Official website
 University of Limerick Writing Center
 Google Maps hybrid view (low resolution)
 Enterprise Research Centre
 Lero

 
1972 establishments in Ireland
Buildings and structures in Limerick (city)
Education in Limerick (city)
Educational institutions established in 1972
Universities and colleges in the Republic of Ireland
Universities using Problem-based learning
Universities established in the 1980s